The Reformed Congress of Lesotho (RCL) is a political party in Lesotho.

History
The party was formed in December 2014 as a breakaway from the Lesotho Congress for Democracy including Labour and Employment Minister Keketso Rantšo, Public Service Minister Motloheloa Phooko and former MPs Mamulula Ntabe and Motšelisi Tuoane. Rantšo was subsequently elected party leader in December.

In the February 2015 general elections the party received 1.2% of the vote, winning two of the proportional seats. In the early elections in 2017 its vote share was reduced to 0.7% and it retained only one of the two seats.

Election results

References

Political parties in Lesotho
2014 establishments in Lesotho
Political parties established in 2014